Benton-Carroll-Salem Local School District is a school district in Northwest Ohio. The school district provides open enrollment so that a student does not have to live in the district limits, however the school primarily serves students who live in the villages and townships of Oak Harbor, Graytown, Rocky Ridge,  Carroll Twp., Benton Twp., Erie Twp., and Salem Twp. located in Ottawa County.
They have been ranked in the top 20% out of all 607 schools in Ohio.

Grades 8-12
Oak Harbor High School

Grades 4-7
Oak Harbor Middle School

Grades K-3
R. C. Waters Elementary School

External links
District Website

School districts in Ohio
Education in Ottawa County, Ohio